Bombax is a genus of  mainly tropical trees in the mallow family. They are native to western Africa, the Indian subcontinent, Southeast Asia, and the subtropical regions of East Asia and northern Australia. It is distinguished from the genus Ceiba, which has whiter flowers.

Common names for the genus include silk cotton tree, simal, red cotton tree, kapok, and simply bombax. Currently four species are recognised, although many plants have been placed in the genus that were later moved.

The genus is best known for the species Bombax ceiba, which is widely cultivated throughout tropical and sub-tropical regions of the world. It is native to southern and eastern Asia and northern Australia.

Bombax species are used as food plants by the larvae of some Lepidoptera species including the leaf-miner Bucculatrix crateracma which feeds exclusively on Bombax ceiba.

The tree appears on the flag of Equatorial Guinea.

The tree fibers are 100% cellulose, able to float, impervious to water, and have a low thermal conductivity. Called Kapok in Asia, the fibers are mainly used for insulation in sleeping bags and life preservers. The fibers are also used as stuffing for pillows and mattresses.

Description

Bombax species are among the largest trees in their regions, reaching 30 to 40 metres in height and up to three metres in trunk diameter. The leaves are compound with entire margins and are deciduous, being shed in the dry-season. They measure 30 to 50 cm across and are palmate in shape with five to nine leaflets. The calyx is deciduous, meaning it does not persist on the fruits. They bear five to ten cm long red flowers between January and March while the tree is still leafless. The stamens are present in bundles in two whorls, while the staminal column lacks lobes. The ovary matures into a husk containing seeds covered by a fibre similar to that of the kapok (Ceiba pentandra) and to cotton, though with shorter fibres than cotton, that does not lend itself to spinning, making it unusable as a textile product.

Species
Plants of the World Online currently includes:
 Bombax albidum Gagnep.
 Bombax anceps Pierre (syn. B. kerrii & B. valetonii)
 Bombax blancoanum A.Robyns
 Bombax buonopozense P. Beauv.
 Bombax cambodiense Pierre
 Bombax ceiba L. (syn. B. thorelii Gagnep.)
 Bombax costatum Pellegr. & Vuill.
 Bombax insigne Wall. (syn. B. scopulorum)

Formerly included species
 Ceiba aesculifolia (Kunth) Britten & Baker (as B. aesculifolium Kunth)
 Ceiba pentandra (L.) Gaertn. (as B. pentandrum L.)
 Cochlospermum orinocense (Kunth) Steud. (as B. orinocense Kunth)
 Cochlospermum religiosum (L.) Alston (as B. gossypium L.)
 Cochlospermum vitifolium (Willd.) Spreng. (as B. vitifolium Willd.)
 Ochroma pyramidale (Cav. ex Lam.) Urb. (as B. pyramidale Cav. ex Lam.)
 Pachira aquatica Aubl. (as P. macrocarpum (Schltdl. & Cham.) K.Schum.)
 Pachira emarginata A.Rich. (as B. emarginata (A.Rich.) C.Wright)
 Pachira insignis (Sw.) Savigny (as B. affine (Mart. & Zucc.) Ducke)
 Pseudobombax ellipticum (Kunth) Dugand (as B. ellipticum Kunth)
 Pseudobombax grandiflorum (Cav.) A.Robyns (as B. cyathophorum (Casar.) K.Schum.)
 Pseudobombax septenatum (Jacq.) Dugand (as B. heptaphyllum L.)
 Rhodognaphalon mossambicense (A.Robyns) A.Robyns (as Bombax mossambicense A.Robyns)

References

Further reading

External links

 
Malvaceae genera